Ahmadabad-e Abbaskhan (also Romanized as Aḩmadābād-e ʿAbbāskhān) is a village in Koshkuiyeh Rural District, Koshkuiyeh District, Rafsanjan County, Kerman Province, Iran. At the 2006 census, its population was 126, in 33 families.

References 

Populated places in Rafsanjan County